Grey Dawn is a 2015 Ghanaian-Nigerian drama film, co-produced and directed by Shirley Frimpong-Manso. It stars Bimbo Manuel, Funlola Aofiyebi-Raimi, Sika Osei and Marlon Mave.

Cast
Bimbo Manuel as Minister
Funlola Aofiyebi-Raimi as
Sika Osei as
Marlon Mave as Jacques
Kofi Middleton Mends as Kweku Yanka

References

External links

English-language Nigerian films
English-language Ghanaian films
2015 drama films
2015 films
Nigerian drama films
Films directed by Shirley Frimpong-Manso
Ghanaian drama films
2010s English-language films